Tuckerman may refer to:

Tuckerman (surname)
Tuckerman, Arkansas, United States
Tuckerman Ravine, a glacial cirque in New Hampshire, United States
Tuckerman Brewing Company, a brewery in New Hampshire, United States

See also